Town Without Pity is a song written by composer Dimitri Tiomkin and lyricist Ned Washington. The track, produced by Aaron Schroeder, was originally recorded by Gene Pitney for the 1961 film of the same title. In the US, the Gene Pitney recording went to #13 on the Hot 100.

This tragic song, in the key of B Minor, first ends the chorus in D Major, before going up a key in the refrain to C Minor, with the coda ending the song in the same minor key.

Awards
In 1962, the song received a Golden Globe Award for Best Song and was nominated for an Academy Award for Best Song (losing to "Moon River" from Breakfast at Tiffany's).

Other versions
Pitney also recorded versions in German (lyrics by Frank Zieboltz), entitled "Bleibe bei mir" ("Stay With Me") and Italian, entitled "Città Spietata".  Many artists and bands have recorded cover versions over the years since its release, including:

Use in other media
 The song is used at the start of the 1996 film SubUrbia.
In an early episode of Saturday Night Live (3/26/77), Laraine Newman played Indira Gandhi with John Belushi as her son Sanjay, who must vacate the premises after losing the election to Morarji Desai (Garrett Morris), but not before bursting into the song.
The song is heard in the 1988 film, Hairspray.
Jess Harnell covered the song for the 1988 film, Elvira: Mistress of the Dark.
The song was also sung by John Travolta to Kirstie Alley in the 1989 romantic comedy, Look Who's Talking. 
The lyrics are referenced by Foetus (James Thirwell) in the song,  "Descent into the Inferno". 
The song was also performed by The Voice season 12 finalist Lilli Passero on the May 1, 2017 episode.
The song can be heard in the series Cold Case in Season 1, Episode 7, "A Time to Hate."

Covers 
Gene Pitney also recorded a German version of the song entitled Blebe bei mir (lyrics: Frank Zieboltz) and an Italian version entitled Città Spietata.

The American rock band Thin White Rope released the song on their 1988 album Red Sun. John Travolta and Kirstie Alley say the song in the 1989 romantic comedy Look Who's Talking! The Dickies, an American punk band from California, also included the song in their program in 1989 as did the band Stray Cats in 1990. American melodic guitarist Neil Zaza covered the song in 1993. Eddi Reader's version of Town Without Pity spent three weeks in the UK Singles Chart in 1996. She released the song on her album Candyfloss and Medicine. Country singer Mandy Barnett also recorded the song in 1999.

The American surf rock band Los Straitjackets from Nashville covered the song in 2004, and modern jazz alto saxophonist Richie Cole included Town Without Pity in his program in 2006. The Norwegian blues guitarist Vidar Busk also recorded the song in 2007. Lilli Passero released the song on her eponymous album in 2017.

References

1961 songs
1961 singles
Danny Williams (singer) songs
Gene Pitney songs
Herb Alpert songs
Stray Cats songs
Songs written for films
Songs with lyrics by Ned Washington
Songs with music by Dimitri Tiomkin
Best Original Song Golden Globe winning songs